Francis Cain may refer to:
 Jim Cain (ice hockey), Canadian ice hockey defenceman
 Francis J. Cain, mayor of Burlington, Vermont